Kirkby-in-Ashfield is a market town in the Ashfield District of Nottinghamshire, England. With a population of 25,265 (according to the 2001 National Census), it is a part of the wider Mansfield Urban Area. The Head Offices of Ashfield District Council are located on Urban Road in the town centre.

Overview
Kirkby-in-Ashfield lies on the eastern edge of the Erewash Valley which separates Nottinghamshire and Derbyshire. Kirkby, as it is locally known, was originally a Danish settlement (Kirk-by translates as 'Church Town' in Danish) and is a collection of small villages including Old Kirkby, The Folly (East Kirkby), Nuncargate and Kirkby Woodhouse. It is mentioned in the Domesday Book and has two main churches: St Wilfrid's, a Norman church, which was gutted by fire on 6 January 1907 but quickly re-built; and St Thomas', built in the early 1910s in neo-gothic style.

History

Kirkby Castle

Kirkby Castle is said to have dated back to at least the 13th Century. Its owner in 1284 Robert de Stuteville was fined by King Edward I for not attending the Royal summons. However, in 1292 Robert clearly forgiven, hosted the king at the Castle to a nights stay.

Tudor times

It was said that Cardinal Thomas Wolsey in 1530 travelled through Sutton in Ashfield having been recalled to London by King Henry VIII, before he stayed at nearby  Kirkby Hardwick.

Coal and transport

Kirkby-in-Ashfield was once an important centre of coal mining and railways in west Nottinghamshire, with three active coal mines and several railway junctions. The former Mansfield and Pinxton Railway from the Erewash Valley Line was joined here by the later Midland Railway line from Nottingham. The Great Central Railway main line passed to the south-west side of the town and had a double junction with the Great Northern Railway Leen Valley Extension line to Langwith Junction and the Mansfield Railway to Clipstone.

Rail stations

The town was served by four stations. Only one is now open:

Kirkby-in-Ashfield East was the main station for the town on the Robin Hood Line. It closed in the 1960s
Kirkby on the Robin Hood Line was opened 1990s and replaced the former station at Kirkby East.
Kirkby-in-Ashfield Central was opened on the now-defunct Mansfield Railway. It closed in the 1950s to passengers and the site is now an industrial estate. Although the old station masters house can be seen.
Kirkby Bentinck was opened on the Great Central Main Line from Nottingham Victoria to Sheffield Victoria. The station closed in the 1960s and the site has been cleared. Although the old station masters house is still in situ. This was the only mainline station in the entire Ashfield and Mansfield District area. With the other being at Annesley and Hollinwell.

The town rapidly expanded during the Victorian era. However the closure of the coal mines in the 1980s and early 1990s led to a major slump in the local economy, and the area then suffered a high level of socio-economic depression.

Regeneration

In 2013, plans were introduced to create a new civic square from what was a car park. Nearby permanent market stalls were removed in October 2014.

The town centre underwent further upgrading, starting in late 2014 and 2015 to include the demolition of the old Co-Operative foodstore and county library with surrounding pedestrian plaza, to be rebuilt with a Morrisons store.

A new indoor market – named Moor Market – was created in 2021 by internally joining adjacent small retail shops into a larger space.

In 2021, a new leisure centre was developed including a swimming pool for the first time in Kirkby, partially on land originally purchased in 1935 by Kirkby Urban District Council, to replace the old Festival Hall.

Education

The town has two large secondary schools, Ashfield School and Outwood Academy Kirkby.

Politics

Local politics have been dominated by the Labour Party for much of the 20th century; however, Ashfield attracted media attention in the late 1970s with a shock by-election win for the Conservatives. From the 2010 General Election until her stepping down in 2019, the MP was Gloria De Piero, best known for her work with GMTV. She took over from Geoff Hoon, one-time Secretary of State for Defence during the premiership of Tony Blair. She was elected with a very slim majority of 192 votes from the Liberal Democrats' Jason Zadrozny. In 2019, Conservative Lee Anderson won the seat.

The town's most famous historical resident is Harold Larwood; the England cricketer who was born in Nuncargate in 1904, best known for his bodyline bowling in the Ashes Test series of 1932–33.

The area around St Wilfrid's Church is designated a conservation area, and consists of former farm buildings built from local stone, some of which are listed. In the conservation area, at the junction of Church Street, Chapel Street and Sutton Road, is Kirkby Cross. This is the remains of a thirteenth-century village cross in dressed stone, and is a listed structure and designated ancient monument.

Notable people
The Rev. Sir Richard Kaye, 6th Baronet FRS. Rector of Kirkby in Ashfield from 1765 to 1809 and Dean of Lincoln.  Kaye employed Samuel Hieronymous Grimm to make a series of drawings of life in Ashfield in the late 18th century.
Oliver Hynd MBE – 2016 & 2012 Paralympic, Gold, Silver, Bronze medallist in swimming, younger brother of Sam Hynd
Sam Hynd – 2008 Paralympic, double gold medallist in swimming.
Enid Bakewell - English cricket player - inaugurated in the ICC Hall of Fame, considered one of the best all rounders in women's cricket
Harold Larwood – English cricket player – famous for the Ashes 'Bodyline Series'
Bill Voce – English cricket player – associated alongside Harold Larwood for the Ashes 'Bodyline Series'
Dave Thomas – former English footballer, played for Everton, Burnley and Queens Park Rangers.
Tom Naylor - English footballer, currently playing for Portsmouth FC. Formerly of Mansfield Town, Derby County, and Burton Albion.
Helen Cresswell –  English television scriptwriter and author was born in the town in 1934.
 Joe Hardstaff (RAF officer) First Class Cricketer. 
 Henry Ely Shacklock Pioneer in Coal Ranges. 
 Carl Toms OBE Costume Designer.

Places of interest 
 Newstead Abbey
 Sherwood Observatory

See also 
 Listed buildings in Kirkby-in-Ashfield
 Kirkby-in-Ashfield railway station
 St John the Evangelist's Church, Kirkby Woodhouse
 Hollinwell incident

References 

 
Towns in Nottinghamshire
Unparished areas in Nottinghamshire
Ashfield District